Trinity Academy Grammar, formerly known as Trinity Academy Sowerby Bridge, is a coeducational secondary school in Sowerby Bridge, Calderdale, West Yorkshire, England. The school specialises in maths and computing, and is attended by over 1000 students.

History
Originally the School which became Sowerby Bridge High School, then later Trinity Academy Grammar, existed in conjunction with the Sowerby Bridge Technical Institute in the Town Hall Chambers on Wharf Street in Sowerby Bridge. In January 1903 it was decided the School should move into the proposed Public Library & Technical Institute on Hollins Mill Lane however this plan did not come to fruition and instead opened as a single storey Carnegie library. In 1905 the new School on Albert Road was opened at Sowerby Bridge Secondary School. This later became Sowerby Bridge Grammar School.

In the 1990s the school reverted from its Grammar School status to a High School. Sowerby Bridge High School was assessed by Ofsted throughout the 2000s and 2010s which showed a downfall in standards at the School until, on 18 October 2016, the School was deemed inadequate and thereafter closed on 30 September 2018 in late 2018 the school was placed under Trinity Multi-Academy Trust and renamed Trinity Academy Sowerby Bridge. In 2021 the school was renamed Trinity Academy Grammar. As of July 2022 no further Ofsted report has been carried out.

Alumni and notable staff

(Sowerby Bridge Grammar School)
Roger Hargreaves - Author (Mr. Men)
Sally Wainwright - TV drama writer
Peter Brook (painter) - Head of Art, painter, particularly of Pennine landscapes, elected to the Royal Society of British Artists 1962

References

External links

Secondary schools in Calderdale
Academies in Calderdale
Sowerby Bridge